Inka Tampu or Inkatampu (Quechua inka Inca, tampu inn, "Inca inn", Hispanicized and mixed spellings Incatambo, Inkatambo, Inca Tambo) is an archaeological site in Peru. It is located in the Cusco Region, La Convención Province, Vilcabamba District. The archaeological group is situated on top of a mountain named Inka Tampu (Inka Tambo).

References 

Archaeological sites in Peru
Mountains of Peru
Archaeological sites in Cusco Region